Doris Hedges (10 April 1896 – 14 July 1972) was a Canadian writer. Her work was part of the literature event in the art competition at the 1948 Summer Olympics.

References

1896 births
1972 deaths
20th-century Canadian women writers
Olympic competitors in art competitions
People from Lachine, Quebec
Writers from Montreal